Michael "Jag" Jagmin is an American musician, notable for being the lead vocalist of post-hardcore band A Skylit Drive and former lead vocalist of metalcore band Odd Project. Jagmin is well known for his distinct high-pitched vocal style and possesses a high tenor voice type with a wide vocal range spanning over three octaves.

Musical career

Odd Project (2006–2007) 
Jagmin was the second vocalist of the metalcore band Odd Project, and was featured on their second album, Lovers, Fighters, Sinners, Saints. He left the band in 2007.

A Skylit Drive (2008–2016) 
Jagmin joined A Skylit Drive to replace original vocalist, Jordan Blake, who left for health concerns in 2007. Since then he has been featured on four full-length releases, Wires...and the Concept of Breathing, Adelphia, Identity on Fire, Rise, and ASD (2015), as well as the DVD, Let Go of the Wires.

Of an Era and Finding Equality 
In addition to his work with A Skylit Drive, Jagmin had an easy listening solo project, entitled Of an Era and operates the clothing line Finding Equality.

Etienne Sin (2012) 
Jagmin supplied guest vocals for a song by Etienne Sin, and appeared in Sin's video.

Solo (2012) 
On April 17, 2012, Jagmin released a solo single titled "Sometimes" on his YouTube channel and on iTunes.

In 2018, he formed a band named Signals and released the album, Death in Divide, on November 27th 2020.

Discography 
Odd Project
Lovers, Fighters, Sinners, Saints (2007)

A Skylit Drive
Wires...and the Concept of Breathing (2008)
Adelphia (2009)
Identity on Fire (2011)
Rise (2013)
ASD (2015)

Signals
"Death In Divide" (2020)

Solo
Sometimes (2012)

Guest appearances
"New Game" on Discovery (LOST, 2010)
"Save Your Breath" on Going Steady (Cradle The Fall, 2012)
"Honey Is Sweet But The Bee Stings" (Etienne Sin, 2012)
"Del Kings" (Etienne Sin, 2013)
"Our Love" (Secret Eyes, 2015)

Videography 
With A Skylit Drive
"Wires and the Concept of Breathing"
"This Isn't the End"
"Knights of the Round"
"All It Takes for Your Dreams to Come True"
"I'm Not a Thief, I'm a Treasure Hunter"
"Those Cannons Could Sink a Ship"
"Too Little Too Late"
"The Cali Buds"
"Crazy"
"Within These Walls"
"Just Stay (Acoustic)"
"Bring Me A War"

With Etienne Sin
"Del Kings"

References 

American rock singers
Living people
Singers from Wyoming
People from Jackson, Wyoming
21st-century American singers
21st-century American male singers
Year of birth missing (living people)